Rush is an unincorporated community in Boyd and Carter counties in the U.S. state of Kentucky. As of the 2000 census, the community had a total population of 2,755 within its postal zip code.

The Boyd County portion of Rush is a part of the Huntington-Ashland Metropolitan Statistical Area (MSA). As of the 2010 census, the MSA had a population of 287,702. New definitions from February 28, 2013 placed the population at 363,000. The reason this community was given the name Rush is obscure. It is located along US 60 and near I-64.

Education 
Ramey-Estep High School, is located in Boyd County.
Star Elementary, is located in Carter County and is part of Carter County Public Schools.
Boyd County Public Schools

External links 
Chamber of Commerce

References

Unincorporated communities in Boyd County, Kentucky
Unincorporated communities in Carter County, Kentucky
Coal towns in Kentucky
Unincorporated communities in Kentucky